NGC 1353 is a flocculent spiral galaxy situated in the constellation of Eridanus. Located about 70 million light years away, it is a member of the Eridanus cluster of galaxies, a cluster of about 200 galaxies. It was discovered by William Herschel on 9 December 1784.

NGC 1353 has a Hubble classification of SBb, which indicates it is a barred spiral galaxy. It is moving away from the Milky Way at 1547 km/s. Its size on the night sky is 3.4 by 1.4 arcminutes, which corresponds to a real size of 69,000 ly.

See also
 NGC 2841, a famous flocculent spiral galaxy

References

External links 
 

Eridanus (constellation)
Barred spiral galaxies
1353
013108